K. Narahari is an Indian politician from the Bharatiya Janata Party, Karnataka who was the Member of Karnataka Legislative Council representing Bangalore Teachers constituency from 1984 till 2002 when he lost to Puttanna of JDS.

References 

Members of the Karnataka Legislative Council
People from Bangalore Urban district

1932 births

Living people
Bharatiya Janata Party politicians from Karnataka